State Route 164 (SR 164) is part of Maine's system of numbered state highways.  It runs  from Presque Isle to Caribou.  It begins at an intersection with U.S. Route 1 (US 1) just north of downtown Presque Isle and travels northwest along the Aroostook River to Crouseville and Washburn. In Washburn, it intersects SR 228. From there, it heads northeast to downtown Caribou. In Caribou, it splits into a one-way pair and also forms a concurrency with SR 161B. The southbound direction of travel through Caribou (physically traveling mostly west) intersects SR 89 at its western terminus. After traveling through the center of the city, the road heads south along Main Street to end at US 1 south of the city center.

Major junctions

References

External links

Floodgap Roadgap's RoadsAroundME: Maine State Route 164

164
Transportation in Aroostook County, Maine